The Church of the Dormition of the Theotokos, simply known as Koimissi or Saint Mary church is an Eastern Orthodox Christian church in the village of Labovë e Kryqit, in Gjirokastër County, southern Albania. It is one of the most representative examples of Byzantine architecture in Albania.

History
The foundation of the church dates back to 6th century at the reign of Byzantine Emperor Justinian (527–565 AD). Justinian erected the church in memory of his mother. The present building dates from the 10th century oraccording to another source13th century, during the time of the Despotate of Epirus.

The church retained a fragment of the True Cross due to a donation by the Byzantine Emperor. Until 1967, it was a pilgrimage destination for the surrounding Christian communities. Each year on the day of the Dormition of the Theotokos, a procession of the Holy Cross fragment with the  icon took place to the adjacent villages. In 1967, religious activities were forbidden by the atheistic policies of the People's Republic of Albania. A number of initiatives to revive such festivities have had limited results. The relic was lost in 1989. According to claims in the Albanian press, it was stolen by the daughter of Enver Hoxha, former head of the People's Republic of Albania.

The church has been declared a Cultural Monument of Albania. Today, it is considered one of the most significant examples of Byzantine architecture in Albania.

Architecture
The church shares a number of typical features of 9th–11th century Byzantine architecture. The connection of the central aisle to the subsidiary aisles as well as the narthex is ensured through a triple passage (tribilon).

Several architectural elements found at the exterior of the building, such as the dome, the windows and the combination of brick- and stonework, are influenced from contemporary Byzantine churches in western Macedonia. The 10th-century dome is the oldest example of circular dome found in the region of Epirus, probably an evolution of the older octagonal style. The fishbone pattern of the exterior is also found in a number of contemporary church buildings in Epirus, western Macedonia and Lakonia, in Greece, although not a quite common feature in Byzantine architecture in general.

See also
Orthodox Autocephalous Church of Albania

References

Sources

Cultural Monuments of Albania
Buildings and structures in Libohovë
Byzantine church buildings in Albania
Eastern Orthodox church buildings in Albania
10th-century churches
13th-century Eastern Orthodox church buildings
13th-century churches